The 2014–15 Swiss Cup was the 90th season of Switzerland's annual football cup competition. The competition started on 23 August 2014 with the first games of Round 1 and ended on 7 June 2015 with the Final, won by Sion. As winners of the competition, they qualified for the Group Stage of the 2015–16 UEFA Europa League. The reigning title holders were Zürich.

Participating clubs
All 19 teams from Super League and Challenge League (teams from Liechtenstein only play in the 2014–15 Liechtenstein Cup) automatically entered this year's competition, as well as 45 teams from lower leagues. Teams from 1. Liga Promotion and below had to qualify through separate qualifying rounds within their leagues. Teams from regional leagues had to qualify by winning the last season's regional cups.

TH Title holders.

Round 1
Teams from Super League and Challenge League were seeded in this round. In a match, the home advantage was granted to the team from the lower league, if applicable.

|-
|colspan="3" style="background-color:#99CCCC"|23 August 2014

|-
|colspan="3" style="background-color:#99CCCC"|24 August 2014

|}

Round 2
The winners of Round 1 played in this round. Teams from Super League were seeded, the home advantage was granted to the team from the lower league, if applicable.

|-
|colspan="3" style="background-color:#99CCCC"|19 September 2014

|-
|colspan="3" style="background-color:#99CCCC"|20 September 2014

|-
|colspan="3" style="background-color:#99CCCC"|21 September 2014

|}

Round 3
The winners of Round 2 played in this round. Teams from Super League were seeded, the home advantage was granted to the team from the lower league. SC Buochs, from the fifth tier of Swiss football, were the lowest-ranked team in this round.

|-
|colspan="3" style="background-color:#99CCCC"|29 October 2014

|-
|colspan="3" style="background-color:#99CCCC"|30 October 2014

|-
|colspan="3" style="background-color:#99CCCC"|3 December 2014

|}

Quarter-finals
The winners of Round 3 played in the Quarter-finals. There was no home advantage granted in the draw. SC Buochs, from the fifth tier of Swiss football, are the lowest-ranked team in this round.

Semi-finals

Final

Match summary
The Final was played on 7 June 2015 Basel against Sion and with an attendance of 35,674 fans the St. Jakob-Park was sold out. Referee was Nikolaj Hänni. An ex-Basler was the match winner for Sion. The Portuguese technical genius Carlitos played the two deadly passes into the depth, which led to the 1–0 by goal getter Moussa Konaté on 18 minutes and the 2–0 by Edimilson Fernandes on 50 minutes. Carlitos himself scored the goal for the 3–0 final result after an hours play. He scored after a cross from Elsad Zverotić with a diving header.

Conclusion
The FC Sion cup myth is alive more than ever after this final, because they celebrated their 13th victory in their 13th final of this knockout competition. Sion didn’t give their opponents a chance, even playing in their own stadium. The 13th Cup triumph will forever have a special place in the club’s history. The Red-Whites have never been able to win a cup final so clearly and the fact that this was achieved with the strongest Super League club over the previous years was astonishing and impressive at the same time.

References

External links
 Official site 
 Official site 

Swiss Cup seasons
Swiss Cup
Cup